Anthony "Tony" Cousineau is an American professional poker player from Daytona Beach, Florida who has cashed 72 times at the World Series of Poker (WSOP), which ranks him 9th in all-time WSOP cashes, and first among players who have never won a WSOP bracelet.

As of 2016, his total live tournament winnings exceed $2,500,000. His 72 cashes at the WSOP account for over $800,000 of those winnings.

Notes

External links
CardPlayer.com bio - Tony Cousineau

American poker players
People from Daytona Beach, Florida
Living people
Year of birth missing (living people)